Omer Faruk Tekbilek (born 1951) is a Turkish musician and composer, who plays a wide range of wind, string, percussion and electronic instruments. He has developed a style that builds on traditional Sufi music, but includes inspiration from ambient electronic musicians, most notably Brian Keane. He is best known for his performances with the flute-like ney, but also plays the piccolo-like kaval, and the double-reed zurna. Among stringed instruments, he plays the oud and the bağlama.

Personal life
Tekbilek's father was a Turk, a religious man who called out the prayers during services in a mosque. His mother was from Egypt, and her love of the music of Riad Al Sunbati was passed to her son, who grew up loving Arabesque music. As a young man, Faruk had studied Sufism and had thought of devoting his life to this mystical branch of Islam. At age 15, he decided to become a professional musician, and quit school. With his brother, he moved to Istanbul, where he befriended a mystical saxophone player named Ismet Siral, who had developed an approach to music based upon intuition: "He would say things like, let's play for birds, let's play for pictures".

In 1971, Tekbilek toured the United States with a Turkish folk ensemble and met his future wife. After completing his compulsory military service in Turkey, Tekbilek returned to America and found few opportunities for a musician of his training. He worked in an apparel factory in Rochester, New York during the week and played with a band called the "Sultans" during his free time; the band was formed with his brother-in-law and a variety of musicians with roots in the eastern Mediterranean. Initially, the band focused on pop, but it soon moved to music with an eastern Mediterranean sound, where Tekbilek could exercise his talents.

Over the next 12 years, Tekbilek honed his craft and had three children, continuing to work in an apparel factory. But in 1988, he was "discovered" by Brian Keane at (Fazil's night club in midtown Manhattan, owner of Fazil's Dance Studios Fazil Cengiz.) who was looking for a specific sound to include in his soundtrack for the movie Suleyman The Magnificent. Keane became Tekbilek's producer, and gradually Tekbilek became better known.  Since 2010, Tekbilek has become well known in his native Turkey and all around the world.

Projects with other musicians
In August 2011 the album "Rock the Tabla" was released featuring Omer Faruk Tekbilek, A. R. Rahman, Hossam Ramzy, Billy Cobham & Manu Katché.

Discography
The Sultans Middle Eastern Band Vol 1 (1981)
The Sultans Middle Eastern Band Vol 2 (1982)
Best of Sultans (1986)
Suleyman The Magnificent (1988)
Fire Dance (1990)
Beyond The Sky (1992)
Whirling (1994)
Fata Morgana (1995)
Mystical Garden (1996)
Crescent Moon (1998)
One Truth (1999, World Class/Hearts of Space Records)
Dance into Eternity: Selected Pieces 1987–1998 (2000)
Alif (2002)
Tree Of Patience (2005)
Rare Elements (Remixes) (2009)
Kelebek (Butterfly) (2009) 
Best of Omar Faruk Tekbilek “Longing” (2010)  
Sound of Istanbul, Vol. 1 (2011)
Dance for Peace "Sufi Selections of OMAR FARUK TEKBILEK" (2011) 
The Meeting of The Legends "Askin Project" (2012) 
Love Is My Religion (2016)

See also
 One (Yuval Ron album)
 Offerings (VAS album)
 Arab Orchestra of Nazareth
 Awards for world music
 List of oud players

References

External links
 
 Short biography

1951 births
Living people
Performers of Sufi music
Turkish flautists
People from Adana